Salah Uddin Ahmed is a Bangladesh Nationalist Party politician and a former Jatiya Sangsad member representing the Dhaka-4 constituency during 1991–1996 and 2001–2006. He has been given the nickname "dhor Salahuddin" after an incident where he was beaten up by his own people of Dhaka-4 when he cut off the water supply to the people.

Career
Ahmed was elected to parliament from Dhaka-4 as a Bangladesh Nationalist Party candidate in 1991 and 2001. In 2018, he was nominated by Bangladesh Nationalist Party for Dhaka-4 constituency. He was attacked and injured in the polling station when he went to vote.

During his term, he was beaten up by the local people of Dhaka-4 and was rushed to an nearby hospital and earned himself the nickname "dhor Salahuddin" after an incident where he allegedly cut off the water supply and then proceeded to strike two women who were protesting against him. He illegally had taken over a College in Syedabad and had it renamed after himself however he later backed out due to pressure from a notable political figure. August 2015, Wari police station filed a chargesheet against 34 people including Ahmed alleging the group set a passenger bus on fire by a petrol bomb and some vehicles were vandalized in front of Gulistan Toll Plaza of Mayor Hanif Flyover in January 2015. Ahmed had become fugitive since then. Upon his surrender to court in February 2021, he was denied bail and then sent to jail.

References

Living people
Bangladesh Nationalist Party politicians
5th Jatiya Sangsad members
6th Jatiya Sangsad members
8th Jatiya Sangsad members
Year of birth missing (living people)
Place of birth missing (living people)